The Port of Karachi (Bandar gāh Karāchī) is one of South Asia's largest and busiest deep-water seaports, handling about 60% of the nation's cargo (25 million tons per annum) located in Karachi, Pakistan. It is located on the Karachi Harbour, between Kiamari azra langri, Manora, and Kakapir, and close to Karachi's main business district and several industrial areas. The geographic position of the port places it in close proximity to major shipping routes such as the Strait of Hormuz. The administration of the port is carried out by the Karachi Port Trust, which was established in 1857.

History

The history of the port is intertwined with that of the city of Karachi. Several ancient ports have been attributed in the area including "Krokola", "Morontobara" (Woman's Harbour) (mentioned by Nearchus), Barbarikon (the Periplus of the Erythraean Sea, and Debal (a city captured by the Arab general Muhammad bin Qasim in 712 CE). There is a reference to the early existence of the port of Karachi in the "Umdah", by the Arab navigator Sulaiman al Mahri (AD 1511), who mentions "Ras al Karazi" and "Ras Karashi" while describing a route along the coast from Pasni to Ras Karashi. Karachi is also mentioned in the sixteenth century Turkish treatise Mir'ât ül Memâlik by the Ottoman captain Seydi Ali Reis, who warns sailors about whirlpools and advises them to seek safety in "Kaurashi" harbour if they found themselves drifting dangerously.

In 1728 heavy rains silted up the harbour at Kharak, forcing merchants to relocate to the area of modern Karachi. The gate facing the sea was called "Kharadar" (salt gate), and the gate facing the Lyari River was called "Mithadar" (sweet gate). From 1729 to 1783 the strategic location of Kolachi saw the town change hands several times between the Khans of Kalat and the rulers of Sind. In 1783, after two prolonged sieges the town fell to the Talpur Mirs of Sind, who constructed Manora Fort mounted with cannons on Manora island at the harbour entrance.

The British were concerned about Russian expansion towards the Arabian Sea, so in 1839 they occupied Karachi and later the whole of the Sindh. The port served as a landing point for troops during the First Afghan War. A number of British companies opened offices and warehouses in Karachi and the population increased rapidly. By 1852, Karachi was an established city with a population of 14,000 and a prosperous overseas trade.

The modern port began to take shape in 1854, when the main navigation channel was dredged and a mole or causeway was constructed to link the main harbour with the rest of the city. This was followed by construction of Manora breakwater, Keamari Groyne, the Napier Mole Bridge and the Native Jetty Bridge. The construction of the wharves started in 1882, and by 1914 the East Wharf and the Napier Mole Boat Wharf were complete while 1927 and 1944, the West Wharf, the lighterage berths and the ship-repair berths were constructed between 1927 and 1944.

By 1899 Karachi was the largest wheat and cotton exporting port in South Asia. The period between 1856 and 1872 saw a marked increase in trade, especially during the American Civil War when cotton from Sindh replaced American cotton as a raw material in the British textile industry and the opening of the Suez Canal in 1869. Karachi was an important military base during the First World War (1914–18) because it was the first British Raj port of call for ships coming through the Suez Canal and was the gateway to Afghanistan and the Russian Empire. Karachi was again a military base and port for supplies to the Russian front during the Second World War (1939–1945). In 1947,the British left the region and India and Pakistan were formed. In 1974, a bunch of terrorists seized a Greek ship and held the Greek crew for a number of hours. They wanted the Greek government to meet their demands. After this, the hostages were released and the terrorists fled the country.

Facilities

The main areas of port activity are two wharves; East Wharf with seventeen vessel berths and West Wharf with thirteen vessel berths. The maximum depth alongside the berths is currently 11.3 metres. The two wharves extend in opposite directions along the upper harbour – the East Wharf northeast from Kiamari Island and the West Wharf southwest from Saddar town. The two wharves each include a container terminal:
Karachi International Container Terminal (KICT) opened in 1996 at West Wharf berths 28-30. It has a handling capacity of 300,000 TEUs per annum and handles container ships up to 11-metre draught. The total quay length is 600 metres divided into two container berths. The terminal is equipped with three Panamax cranes and one post-Panamax crane.
Pakistan International Bulk Terminal (PIBT) in 2002 at East Wharf berths 6-9. It has a handling capacity of 350,000 TEUs per annum and handles container ships up to 11.5-metre draught. The total quay length is 600 metres divided into two container berths. The terminal is equipped with two Panamax cranes.
KICT and PICT have a nearby competitor in the privately operated Al-Hamd International Container Terminal (AICT), which opened in 2001 at a site west of the Layari river. AICT is situated next to the Sindh Industrial Trading Estate, the new truck stand at Hawkes Bay Road and close to the RCD Highway, Super Highway and the future Layari Bypass.

There are also three liquid cargo-handling berths (oil piers), two ship repair jetties and a shipyard and engineering facility. The shipyard carries out shipbuilding and repair for both commercial and military customers on a 29-hectare (70 acres) site at the West Wharf. The facilities include a large shipbuilding hall, three shipbuilding berths, two dry-docks and three foundries.

Expansion
The flow of cargo to and from the port is hampered by severe congestion in the harbour with several other maritime facilities located close to the port. Adjacent to the West Wharf is the Karachi Fishing Harbour, which is administered separately from the port and is the base for a fleet of several thousand fishing vessels. The West Wharf also hosts a ship repair facility and shipyard and a naval dockyard at the tip of the wharf, while to the south of the port are the Karachi Naval Base and the Kiamari Boat Club.

The Port of Karachi also faces competition from a new private terminal located 5 kilometres to the west. In recent years the federal government has attempted to alleviate the increased congestion by constructing a second port in Karachi thirty kilometres to the east at Port Qasim and a third major port at Gwadar, about 650 kilometres west of Karachi.

The Karachi Fishing Harbour has been upgraded recently, and a second fishing harbour has been built 18 kilometres away at Korangi. The transfer of some naval vessels to the new naval base at Ormara has brought about further reductions in congestion.

Further deepening of the port has been planned by the Karachi Port Trust in order to enhance facilities. The channel is being dredged initially to 13.5 metres deep to cater for 12-metre draught vessels at all tides. At Kiamari Groyne, located at the outer tip of the harbour, dredging will be to 16.5 metres to enable vessels up to 300 metres long to dock. Other projects to expand the port include:
An increase the handling capacity of KICT from 300,000 TEUs to 400,000 TEUs per annum
Two new berths at KICT with 14 metres depth alongside and an additional 100,000 m² terminal/stacking area
Installation of modern facilities at PICT (completed in April 2004)
A new bulk cargo terminal at East Wharf
A new  cargo village to cater for containers and general and bulk cargo
Reconstruction of the 100-year-old NMB Wharf to enhance the berthing of passenger vessels
The purchase of a new dredger, two hopper barges, two harbour tugs, two water barges, an anchor hoist vessel, two pilot boats, and a dredger tender
A new desalination plant to address the city's water shortage problem
The construction of a 500-acre (2 km²) Port Town with 13,000 homes for port workers at nearby Hawkes Bay
A new Port Club at Chinna Creek adjacent to the East Wharf

On 9 November 2007, the Karachi Port Trust signed a US$1 billion agreement with Hutchison Port Holdings to construct a new terminal called the "Pakistan Deep Water Container Port", which would begin operations by 2010, and would have ten berths capable of handling Super Post Panamax container ships.

South Asia Pakistan Terminal 

Since 2016, South Asia Pakistan Terminal (SAPT) operates biggest deep sea port of the country. Hutchison Ports Pakistan invested $600m on the first phase of SAPT, he first phase include two berths having length of 800 metres.

Hutchison Ports Pakistan, subsidiary of Hutchison Port Holdings, which in turn subsidiary of CK Hutchison Holdings. Hutchison Ports Pakistan welcomed CV COSCO BELGIUM, with length over all of 366 meters and a capacity of 13,386 TEUs to ever call at any port of Pakistan, .

Environmental concerns

The area around the harbour includes several mangrove forests which are constantly under threat from human activities. To the east of the port lies Chinna Creek, which covers about 6 km² and is dotted with mangrove islands. To the southwest of the port is another much larger mangrove forest in the bay formed by several islands and Manora breakwater; the river Layari flows into this bay, bringing waste from upstream suburbs.

The beach immediately east of the harbour was the scene of a significant oil spillage when the Greek-registered Tasman Spirit ran aground on 28 July 2003. The environmental impact included large numbers of dead fish and turtles and damage to a key mangrove forest, as well as dozens of people suffering nausea.

Labour relations
The Karachi Dock Labour Board (KDLB) is responsible for labour relations between employees and the Karachi Port Trust. In October 2006, the Pakistan government decided to close down Karachi Dock Labour Board by the end of the year as part of its port strategy and under the National Trade Corridor (NTC) programme. The closure of KDLB would cost around Rs 4.2 billion ($70 million) to the national exchequer.

See also

List of ports in Pakistan
Pakistan Marine Academy
Pakistan Merchant Navy
Gwadar port
Transport in Karachi
Transport in Pakistan
Ministry of Maritime Affairs (Pakistan)

References

External links

Report on the state and requirements of the Kurrachee harbour works (Karachi harbor works) on GoogleBooks

 
Economic history of Karachi
Transport in Karachi
Ports and harbours of Pakistan